"The Final Countdown" is a song by Swedish rock band Europe, released in 1986. Written by lead singer Joey Tempest, it was based on a keyboard riff he made in the early 1980s, with lyrics inspired by David Bowie's "Space Oddity". Originally made to just be a concert opener, it is the first single and title track from the band's third studio album. The music video by Nick Morris, made to promote the single, has become iconic with 1 billion views on YouTube. The video features footage from the band's two concerts at Solnahallen in Solna, as well as extra footage of the sound checks and footage from Stockholm.

Origin and recording
The song was based on a keyboard riff which Joey Tempest had written, as early as 1981 or 1982, on a Korg Polysix keyboard which he had borrowed from keyboardist Mic Michaeli. In 1985, bassist John Levén suggested that Tempest should write a song based on that riff. Tempest recorded a demo version of the song and played it for the other band members. At first, the members expressed mixed reactions to it, including guitarist John Norum who was put off by the synth intro but said that he was glad that they didn't listen to him. Tempest described their uncertainty: "Some of the guys in the band thought it was too different for a rock band. But in the end, I fought hard to make sure it got used."

The song's lyrics were inspired by David Bowie's song "Space Oddity". The sound of the keyboard riff used in the recording was achieved by using a Yamaha TX-816 rack unit and a Roland JX-8P synthesizer, as described by Michaeli: "I made a brassy sound from the JX-8P and used a factory sound from the Yamaha, and just layered them together."

When it was time to choose the first single from the album The Final Countdown, Tempest suggested the song "The Final Countdown". The band had not originally planned to release the song as a single, and some members wanted "Rock the Night" to be the first single. "The Final Countdown" was written to be an opening song for concerts, and they never thought it would be a hit. When their record company Epic Records suggested, however, that it should be the first single, the band decided to release it.

As Tempest stated:

It's always a nice feeling. Sometimes, you hear it on the streets or someone has it on their mobile phone or something… it's a nice feeling! Actually, I did an interview about a year ago with a newspaper from America and they talked about how much it's been used in sports in America… which I didn't know so much about. Apparently, it has been used a lot and it was nice to hear. The ironic thing, though, is that the song was actually written for the fans. It was over six minutes long and was never meant to be a hit or anything like that. It was meant to be an opening for the 'live' show. We were putting out our third album and we wanted a really 'grand' opening for the show. So, I had that 'riff' tucked away in a drawer since my college years and I took it out, found a tempo for it, wrote lyrics, and it turned out to be a great opening for that album and for the show, as well. Nowadays, we don't rehearse it, but when we play it live, it is still just so amazing! It does communicate so well with the audience and we really love playing it.

In 2009, Tempest told the BBC's Liam Allen, "I can trace bands like UFO in it, sort of a galloping theme like Iron Maiden had on The Number of the Beast album on quite a few songs. I wanted to make a combination of guitars and keyboards. That was a statement on that and it sort of worked out nicely." It is set in the key of F♯ minor.

Release and reception
"The Final Countdown" became an instant success on the charts worldwide upon its release, reaching number one in 25 countries (including the UK, where it spent two weeks at the top and is Europe's only Top 10 hit to date), and is widely regarded as the band's most popular and recognizable song. The single reached number 8 on the US Billboard Hot 100 chart, and is the most successful song from the album on the Album Rock Tracks chart, peaking at number 18 (and charting for 20 weeks).

The song is also the band's highest-charting single in Australia and Canada, peaking at number 2 and at number 5.

Blender listed "The Final Countdown" as the 27th worst song ever, and both VH1 and Blender included it at 16 on the list of the "Most Awesomely Bad Songs...Ever". VH1 ranked it at number 66 on their list of the best hard rock songs of all time.

Music video
The music video, directed by Nick Morris, contains footage from two concerts the band did at Solnahallen in Solna, Sweden on 26 and 27 May 1986, as well as some extra footage filmed at the sound checks for those concerts.

Live performances
The song has been a regular in Europe concerts ever since its live debut on the premiere of their Final Countdown Tour in April 1986. One of the most memorable performances of the song took place in Stockholm, Sweden on 31 December 1999, as part of the Millennium celebrations, as it was the first, and to date only, Europe performance with both of the band's lead guitarists, the original guitarist John Norum and his replacement, Kee Marcello.

Personnel 

 Joey Tempest – lead vocals
 John Norum – lead guitar, backing vocals
 John Levén – bass guitar
 Mic Michaeli – keyboards, backing vocals
 Ian Haugland – drums, backing vocals

Charts
The song reached number one in 25 countries, including the United Kingdom, and was certified gold in that country in 1986. In the United States, the song peaked at number 8 on the Billboard Hot 100 and number 18 on the Billboard Album Rock Tracks chart.

Weekly charts

Year-end charts

Certifications and sales

The Final Countdown 2000

In 1999, the dance remix "The Final Countdown 2000" was released. It was produced by Brian Rawling, who had previously had success with "Believe" by Cher. The band's reaction to the remix was less than enthusiastic. "That remix was a disaster", drummer Ian Haugland said, "I wouldn't pass water on it if it was on fire!" In a 2013 interview with The National, Joey Tempest commented on the remix, saying, "The band were not happy with it. We were trying to get some other people to do the remix and it just didn't pan out, so it ended up becoming a last-minute thing."

Chart positions

Year-end charts

Legacy

The song is a favourite at sporting events, often being played to rally crowds. It has also become a staple of high school and college pep bands for the same purpose. 

On 26 December 1987, the Hellenic Broadcasting Corporation (ΕΡΤ), used the song as the theme for the documentary "The Road to Glory" about EuroBasket 1987, which was won by the Greek national team. Since then, the song is considered by fans as the unofficial anthem of the team.

On 2 October 1990, just a few hours before the German reunification, the English segment of international radio broadcaster of former East Germany RBI, played the intro of the song while the female radio announcer says: "Our broadcast came to you from Radio Berlin International, the voice of the disappearing German Democratic Republic".

The song and band Europe appeared in a 2015 USA television commercial for GEICO insurance, playing in a lunchroom as a microwave oven's timer is counting down toward zero seconds, saying if you're Europe, "you love a final countdown: it's what you do."

The song was used as entrance music for professional wrestler Bryan Danielson on the independent circuit and in Ring of Honor.

The song's opening strands was briefly used in a scene in DC League of Super-Pets, where the characters PB, Merton McSnurtle and Chip attempt to harness their newly-attained superpowers in a parody of a superhero training montage, only to clumsily fail in the process.

Cover versions
"The Final Countdown" is a particular favourite of guitarist Ritchie Blackmore, who incorporated elements of it into "Gone with the Wind", his 1999 reimagining of Lev Knipper's "Polyushko-polye".

American husband-and-wife banjo-players Béla Fleck and Abigail Washburn performed an interpretation of the song in May 2015 for The A.V. Club A.V. Undercover series. Time magazine called out the cover as "really, really lovely."

See also
List of Dutch Top 40 number-one singles of 1986
List of European number-one hits of 1986
List of number-one hits of 1986 (Germany)
List of number-one hits of 1986 (Italy)
List of number-one singles and albums in Sweden
List of number-one singles of 1986 (Ireland)
List of number-one singles of 1986 (France) 
List of number-one singles of 1987 (Spain)
List of number-one singles of the 1980s (Switzerland)
List of UK Singles Chart number ones of the 1980s

References

1986 singles
1986 songs
1999 singles
Dutch Top 40 number-one singles
Epic Records singles
Europe (band) songs
European Hot 100 Singles number-one singles
Irish Singles Chart number-one singles
Number-one singles in Austria
Number-one singles in Finland
Number-one singles in Germany
Number-one singles in Italy
Number-one singles in Poland
Number-one singles in South Africa
Number-one singles in Spain
Number-one singles in Sweden
Number-one singles in Switzerland
SNEP Top Singles number-one singles
Song recordings produced by Brian Rawling
Songs about spaceflight
Songs about parting
Songs written by Joey Tempest
UK Singles Chart number-one singles
Ultratop 50 Singles (Flanders) number-one singles